Tarbolton railway station (NGR NS440250) was a railway station about a mile and a quarter from the village of Tarbolton that it served, in South Ayrshire, Scotland. The station was part of the Ayr to Mauchline Branch of the Glasgow and South Western Railway and was the only intermediate stop on the previously double track line between Annbank and Mauchline. The line was singled in 1985 and held in reserved state before reopening with an increase in coal traffic.

History
The station opened on 1 September 1870, and closed to passengers on 4 January 1943. The signal box was still operational in 1963 to control the passing loop; both platforms were also in situ.

Today this line is still open as a freight line.

References

External links
Video and commentary on Tarbolton railway station.
Video of A1 Pacific 'Tornado' passing the station on a charter.
 Tarbolton station in 1963

Disused railway stations in South Ayrshire
Railway stations in Great Britain opened in 1870
Railway stations in Great Britain closed in 1943
Former Glasgow and South Western Railway stations